Progress-M1 (GRAU indices 11F615A55 and 11F615A70), also known as Progress 7K-TGM1, is a Russian spacecraft which is used to resupply space stations. It is a variant of the Progress spacecraft, derived from the Progress-M, but modified to carry more UDMH and N2O4 propellant for refuelling the International Space Station instead of other cargoes such as water. This propellant can be transferred to the Space Station's own propulsion system through fluid connectors in the docking ring, or it can alternatively be used by the Progress' thrusters to boost the station altitude or to change its orientation, or attitude, in space.

The Progress-M1 11F615A70 is a modernised variant of the earlier 11F615A55, with digital flight control systems replacing the earlier analogue ones. The older 11F615A55 spacecraft is no longer in use. It made eleven flights, the last of which, Progress M1-11, was deorbited in June 2004. The 11F615A70 was scheduled to make its first flight, Progress M1-01M, in 2011 but was cancelled.

Of the eleven 11F615A55 spacecraft launched, three flew to Mir, with the remainder being used to resupply the International Space Station. Ten of the spacecraft were used for traditional resupply missions, whilst the eleventh, Progress M1-5, was used instead to deorbit the Mir space station.

Progress-M1 spacecraft are launched by Soyuz rockets. Eight of the 11F615A55 spacecraft were launched by the Soyuz-U variant, whilst the remaining three; the sixth, seventh and ninth spacecraft, flew on the Soyuz-FG. 11F615A70 launches are expected to use the Soyuz-2 but was cancelled.

See also
Automated Transfer Vehicle
Cygnus spacecraft
SpaceX Dragon

References

Progress (spacecraft)